The 2018–19 Pac-12 Conference men's basketball season began with practices in October 2018 followed by the 2018–19 NCAA Division I men's basketball season on November 6, 2018. The conference schedule will begin in December 2018. This is the seventh season under the Pac–12 Conference name and the 59th since the conference was established under its current charter as the Athletic Association of Western Universities in 1959. Including the history of the Pacific Coast Conference, which operated from 1915 to 1959 and is considered by the Pac-12 as a part of its own history, this is the Pac-12's 103rd season of basketball.

The Pac-12 tournament was held from March 13–16, 2019, at the T-Mobile Arena in Paradise, Nevada.

Pre-season

Recruiting classes

Preseason watchlists
Below is a table of notable preseason watch lists.

Preseason All-American teams

Preseason polls

Pac-12 Media days
Source:

 October 11–12, 2018  – Pac-12 Men's Basketball Media Day, Pac-12 Networks Studios, San Francisco, Calif.

Early season tournaments

Midseason watchlists
Below is a table of notable midseason watch lists.

Final Watchlists

Regular season
The Schedule will be released in late September. Before the season, it was announced that for the sixth consecutive season, all regular season conference games and conference tournament games would be broadcast nationally by CBS Sports, FOX Sports, ESPN Inc. family of networks including ESPN, ESPN2 and ESPNU, and the Pac-12 Network.

Records against other conferences
2018-19 records against non-conference foes as of (Jan. 2, 2018):

Regular Season

Record against ranked non-conference opponents
This is a list of games against ranked opponents only (Rankings from the AP Poll):

Team rankings are reflective of AP poll when the game was played, not current or final ranking

† denotes game was played on neutral site

Conference schedule
This table summarizes the head-to-head results between teams in conference play.

Points scored

Through March 11, 2019

Rankings

Head coaches

Coaches
Note: Stats shown are before the beginning of the season. Overall and Pac-12 records are from time at current school.

Notes:
 Overall and Pac-12 records, conference titles, etc. are from time at current school and are through the end the 2018–19 season.
 NCAA tournament appearances are from time at current school only.
 NCAA Final Fours and Championship include time at other schools
 Steve Allford fired from UCLA on 12/31/18 with a 7-6 record

Post season

Pac-12 tournament

Oregon won the conference tournament held March 13–16, 2019, at the T-Mobile Arena, Paradise, NV. The top four teams had a bye on the first day. Teams were seeded by conference record, with ties broken by record between the tied teams followed by record against the regular-season champion, if necessary.

NCAA tournament

Three teams from the conference were selected to participate: Oregon, Washington and Arizona State.

National Invitation Tournament 
One team from the conference were selected to participate: Colorado.

Awards and honors

Players of the Week 
Throughout the conference regular season, the Pac-12 offices named one or two players of the week each Monday.

Totals per School

All-Americans

All-District

Conference awards
Voting was by conference coaches.

Individual awards

All-Pac-12

First Team

 ‡ Pac-12 Player of the Year
 †† two-time All-Pac-12 First Team honoree
 † two-time All-Pac-12 honoree

Second Team

Honorable Mention
 Noah Dickerson (WASH, F), Louis King (ORE, F), Nick Rakocevic (USC, F), Josh Sharma (STAN, F).

All-Freshman Team

‡ Pac-12 Freshman of the Year
Honorable Mention
 Brandon Williams (ARIZ, G)

All-Defensive Team

‡Pac-12 Defensive Player of the Year
Honorable Mention
Moses Brown (UCLA, C), McKinley Wright IV (COLO, G).

All-Academic team
First Team

‡ indicates player was Pac-12 Scholar-Athlete of the Year
†† two-time Pac-12 All-Academic honoree
††† three-time Pac-12 All-Academic honoree

Second Team

Honorable Mention
 Evan Battey (COLO), Oscar da Silva (STAN), De’Quon Lake  (ASU), Alexander Strating (COLO),; Justice Sueing (CAL), Tres Tinkle (OSU), Parker Van Dyke (UTAH)

2019 NBA draft

Home game attendance 

Bold – At or Exceed capacity
†Season High

References